Chrysoritis stepheni is a species of butterfly in the family Lycaenidae. It is endemic to South Africa. It is mostly treated as a subspecies of Chrysoritis beaufortius.

Sources
 
 "Poecilmitis stepheni Dickson 1978". Encyclopedia of Life, available from "http://www.eol.org/pages/257895".

Chrysoritis
Butterflies described in 1978
Endemic butterflies of South Africa
Taxonomy articles created by Polbot
Taxobox binomials not recognized by IUCN